Marc Handler is an American writer, producer and voice director best known for his work on Cowboy Bebop, Astro Boy, FLCL, Stitch & Ai, and Voltron. He is a pioneer in bringing Asian animation to Western audiences, and is the first American to work in Japan as a story editor on a Japanese anime series, the 2003 Astro Boy series.

Early life
Marc was born and raised in Los Angeles, California. As a young adult, he formed the Subject To Change Theatre Troupe, which was active in political causes such as support for Nelson Mandela in South Africa. He studied at the University of Southern California where he earned two Master's degrees in directing theatre and writing for film and television.

Career
Marc wrote original episodes for American animation series such as Teenage Mutant Ninja Turtles, Widget the World Watcher, and Denver, the Last Dinosaur. He became involved in the first major wave of imported anime for Western audiences, writing English language scripts and adaptations for Voltron, Saber Rider and Transformers. As anime evolved, he worked as a writer and voice director on projects such as Cowboy Bebop (TV series and film), FLCL, Ghost in the Shell, Steamboy, and Metropolis. He also voice directed Stephen Chow in Hong Kong for the English language version of Shaolin Soccer, and wrote episodes for the 2011-2012 successful revival of Power Rangers based on the Japanese Super Sentai series. Marc was later involved in bringing original Chinese and Korean animation to the West, including Stitch & Ai (Disney, China); Peking Duckling (UYoung, China/ Little Airplane, USA); Kioka (Goldilocks, Korea); and Mix Master Final Force (Sunwoo, Korea).

Marc was a guest speaker at the Conference On Dialogue Of Asian Civilization in Beijing in 2019; which was hosted by President Xi Jinping. Marc also spoke at The Great Hall of the People for the Beijing Film Academy in 2019, and he has been a judge for the Canadian BANFF awards; a guest speaker at Tokyo University; a guest speaker at San Diego Comic-Con and Anime L.A., and has organized and led a series of annual workshops in the U.S. for Chinese Animation professionals hosted by Disney, China and Disney, Burbank..

He has written two books on writing and presentations which were published by Beijing University Press in China and Freelec Publishers in Korea.

Marc is a member of the Writers Guild of America and Screen Actors Guild. He has also been a lecturer at the University of Southern California and Glendale College.

Personal life
Marc is married to Annet Yorn; they have one son, Kai Handler. They live alternately in Shanghai, China and Phnom Penh, Cambodia.

Awards

ADR / voice director
 The Adventures of Hutch the Honeybee
 Astro Boy - Pilot episode only
 Avalon
 Bit, The Cupid
 Born to Fight
 Cowboy Bebop: The Movie
 Dinozaurs
 Eagle Riders
 FLCL
 Kioka
 Little Magic Dragon
 Naruto
 Nomad
 Rave Master
 Shaolin Soccer
 Super Pig
 Ted & Dory Detectives
 Tenchi Forever
 Tokyo Raiders
 Voltron: The Third Dimension
 Zatoichi
 Zu Warriors

Script writer / adapter
 The Adventures of Hutch the Honeybee – ADR Writer
 Astro Boy – Writer
 B-Legend! Battle Bedaman – ADR Writer
 Beat Down: Fists of Vengeance – Writer
 Born to Fight – ADR Writer
 Castlevania: Curse of Darkness – Writer
 Code Geass – ADR Writer
 Code Lyoko – Composite Writer
 Cowboy Bebop – ADR Writer
 Cowboy Bebop: The Movie – ADR Writer
 Denver, the Last Dinosaur – Writer
 Dinozaurs – ADR Writer
 Dive Olly Dive – ADR Writer
 The Dragon Who Wasn't – ADR Writer
 Eagle Riders – ADR Writer
 FLCL – ADR Writer
 Fireball – ADR Writer
 Freedom – ADR Writer (Co-Written with Michael Sinterniklaas, Jay Snyder and Stephanie Sheh)
 Ghost in the Shell: Stand Alone Complex – ADR Writer
 .Hack//Liminality – ADR Writer
 Initial D – ADR Writer
 Kessen II – Writer
 Little Magic Dragon – ADR Writer
 Metropolis – ADR Writer
 Mix Master – ADR Writer
 The Moo Family – Writer
 Naruto – ADR Writer (Co-Written with Liam O'Brien, Sam Regal, Seth Walther, Ardwight Chamberlain, and Jeff Nimoy)
 The New World of the Gnomes – Writer
 Nomad – ADR Writer
 Power Rangers Samurai – Writer
 Power Rangers Megaforce – Writer
 Pretty Sammy – ADR Writer
 Saber Rider – Writer & ADR Writer
 Seven Samurai 20XX – Writer
 Shaolin Soccer – ADR Script
 Shinzo – ADR Writer
 Steamboy – ADR Writer
 Super Pig – ADR Writer
Teenage Mutant Ninja Turtles – Writer
 Tenchi Forever – ADR Writer
 Tenchi in Tokyo – ADR Writer
 Tokyo Pig – ADR Writer
 Transformers: Robots in Disguise – ADR Writer
 Transformers: Cybertron – ADR Writer
 Voltron: The Third Dimension – ADR Writer
 Vytor: The Starfire Champion – Writer
 Widget – Writer
 Zatoichi – ADR Writer

Story editor
 Astro Boy – Executive Story Editor
 Cowboy Bebop – Story Editor
 Denver, the Last Dinosaur – Executive Story Editor
 Mix Master – Story Editor
 Final Force
 King of Cards
 Naruto – Executive Story Editor
 Seasons 1 & 2
 Saber Rider and the Star Sheriffs – Executive Story Editor
 Shinzo – Story Editor
 Voltron – Executive Story Editor
Voltron: The Third Dimension – Executive Story Editor
 Vytor: The Starfire Champion – Story Editor

Casting
 Mix Master – Casting Director
 Nomad: The Warrior – Voice Casting

Actor
 Mix Master – Zombie, Wrestler (voice)
 No Place to Hide – Student
 Sole Survivor – Undercover Cop

References

External links

Living people
American television writers
American male screenwriters
American male television writers
American male voice actors
Year of birth missing (living people)
American male film actors
American casting directors
American voice directors
Writers from Los Angeles
Screenwriters from California